Septimius Bassus (fl. 317–319) was a Roman politician, and a member of the Septimia gens.

Life
Bassus was born in a senatorial family, the son of Lucius Septimius Severus (b. c. 245) and wife Pomponia Bassa (born c. 250). His paternal grandfather was a Lucius Septimius ... (b. c. 210), son of Gaius Septimius Severus Aper, while his maternal grandparents were the Roman Senator Pomponius Bassus and wife the noblewoman Pomponia Gratidia. Through his maternal grandfather, Bassus was a descendant of the Roman emperor Marcus Aurelius, Roman empress Faustina the Younger and of the former ruling Nerva–Antonine dynasty of the Roman Empire.

Bassus was praefectus urbi of Rome between 317 (he is attested in office on 15 May) until 319 (at least until 1 September). Between 13 July and 13 August 318, he was at court; for this reason he was substituted by Julius Cassius.

He had a daughter, Septimia Bassa, born c. 305, who was the first wife of Valerius Maximus Basilius.

Ancestry

References
 "Septimius Bassus 19", Prosopography of the Later Roman Empire, Volume 1, Cambridge University Press, 1992, p. 157.

4th-century deaths
4th-century Romans
Bassus
Urban prefects of Rome
Year of birth unknown
Year of death unknown